The Divination by Astrological and Meteorological Phenomena, also known as Book of Silk is an ancient astronomy silk manuscript compiled by Chinese astronomers of the Western Han Dynasty (202 BC – 9 AD) and found in the Mawangdui  of Changsha, Hunan, China in 1973.  It lists 29 comets (referred to as 彗星, huì xīng, literally broom stars) that appeared over a period of about 300 years.

It is now exhibited in the Hunan Provincial Museum.

Contents
The Divination by Astrological and Meteorological Phenomena contains what archaeologists claim is the first definitive atlas of comets. There are roughly two dozen renderings of comets, some in fold out/pop-up format. In some cases, the pages of the document roll out to be five feet long. Each comet's picture has a caption which describes an event its appearance corresponded to, such as "the death of the prince", "the coming of the plague", or "the three-year drought."

See also
 Chinese astrology
 Chinese astronomy
 Chu Silk Manuscript
 Mawangdui Silk Texts

References

External links
Ancient Chinese Astronomy
Hunan Provincial Museum

3rd-century BC manuscripts
2nd-century BC manuscripts
1st-century BC manuscripts
1st-century manuscripts
1973 archaeological discoveries
Astronomy books
Astronomy in China
Astrological texts
History of Changsha